Suite Chic was a collaborative project between some of Japan's top and up-and-coming R&B and hip hop artists, writers, and producers, which debuted on December 18, 2002.

Suite Chic served as a vehicle for pop singer Namie Amuro, who at the time was establishing herself as a credible R&B artist following a decline in her popularity as a pop singer. Since the dissolution of the project many of its participants have gone on to greater mainstream success and the project revived Amuro's career.

In a late 2005 interview, Amuro said she would like to have Suite Chic make a comeback in 2006, but nothing came of it.

History 
Ryosuke Imai talked with Verbal of (m-flo) about who was the Japanese Janet Jackson. They reached the conclusion that it was "Namie Amuro", who at the time had seen her career fade following a hiatus. They produced demos without permission and proposed them to Amuro. The project featured up-and-coming DJs and hip-hop producers such as DJ Muro, Dabo and hip-hop singer Ai (singer) on the single  "Uh Uh......", who would herself go on to great success.

Verbal named this project Suite Chic, a combination of "High-class (Suite) & Cool (Chic)".

Discography

Albums

Singles

Video albums 
26 March 2003 - When Pop Hits the Pix

Participants 
  Firstklas (Riyosuke Imai+Zeebra)
 Verbal
 Namie Amuro
 Ai
 Dabo
 XBS
 Daisuke Imai
 Akira
 DJ Muro
 DJ Watarai
 Tsutchie （Shakkazombie）
 DJ Celory （Soul Scream）
 Yakko for Aquarius
 Michico
etc.

References

Namie Amuro